Messie Biatoumoussoka (born 5 June 1998) is a professional footballer who plays as a centre-back for the Bulgarian club Botev Vratsa in the First League. Born in France, he plays for the Congo national team.

Career
Biatoumoussoka is a youth product of the academies of CO Beauvais, AS Beauvais and Le Havre. He began his senior career with the reserves of Bordeaux where he won the French U19 tournament in 2017. He moved to Belgium with Charleroi on 26 June 2018. He was loaned to the reserves of Avranches for the 2019–20 season. In 2021, he moved to the Cypriot club POX FC, with a stint at the Romanian club 1599 Șelimbăr in 2021. He returned to POX FC for the second half of the 2021–22 season. In the summer of 2022, he transferred to the Bulgarian club Botev Vratsa.

International career
Born in France, Biatoumoussoka is of Brazzaville-Congolese descent. He debuted for the Congo national team in a friendly 2–0 loss to Mauritania on 27 September 2022.

References

External links
 
 

1998 births
Living people
Sportspeople from Saint-Denis, Seine-Saint-Denis
Republic of the Congo footballers
Republic of the Congo international footballers
French footballers
French sportspeople of Republic of the Congo descent
Association football defenders
FC Girondins de Bordeaux players
R. Charleroi S.C. players
US Avranches players
CSC 1599 Șelimbăr players
FC Botev Vratsa players
Championnat National 3 players
Cypriot Second Division players
Liga II players
First Professional Football League (Bulgaria) players